Henrikki Laavunpoika of Kankainen, or Henrik Klasson Horn  (c. 1512–1595), was a Swedish military officer and Governor-General of Finland. He was an ancestor of the noble Swedish family, Horn af Kanckas.

Biography
He was the son of  Klas Henriksson Horn (c. 1445 – c. 1520)  and his second wife Kristina  Jakobsdotter (c. 1495 – c. 1553). His father was a member of the  Privy Council of Sweden. His elder half-brother, Krister Laavunpoika of Joensuu (c. 1480 – c. 1519) was  bailiff of Turku castle.  
His parents presumably married in 1511 when his father was commander of the Vyborg Castle (Finnish: Viipurin linna). Lady Kristina  of Salmenkylä was heiress of Töytärinhovi Manor and its estate, as well as of an estate in Reitkalli, an estate in Salmenkylä, an estate in Sivatti, an estate in Pyöli, and a house and harbor estate in Hietakylä (today Hamina), near the medieval church of Vehkalahti, and additionally heiress of a portion of the Vanhakartano Manor of Lammi  in the province of Häme.

He  was not quite  ten years old when his father died, probably in summer 1520. Mother and son resided chiefly at Haapaniemi Manor in Kisko, on the borders of Nylandia and Finland, where Kirsti is recorded as widow by 1524 and in 1530. Around 1531, Kristi married Jaakko Vundrank (floruit 1529 – c. 1548), an administrator in service of King Gustav Vasa of Sweden and a fiefholder of Elimäki in Kymenlaakso. That marriage produced sometime in the 1530s, Tyni Jaakonpoika Vundrank, lord of Salmenkylä (fl. 1560s & 1570s, died before 1584).

In the 1530s he was serving King Gustav, both at the royal court and in the military. He was briefly over-governor of Stockholm castle. Then he was inspector of royal revenues in Finland and commander of Finnish infantry. Henrik worked under Gustav and his two oldest sons King Erik XIV of Sweden and King John III of Sweden (who ruled Finland under the title of Duke John). He became chief judge in southern Finland through 1549 – 1561.  He was also appointed Governor-General of Finland in 1551. In 1555 he participated in the campaign against Shlisselburg (Swedish: Nöteborg). King Eric XIV of Sweden knighted him at his royal coronation (1561) and he was sent as commander-in-chief to the Livonian front.

Between 1558 and 1563 he was one of Duke John's closest advisors.  He then served under King Erik XIV, and was made a colonel during the Livonian War in October 1563 and Governor of Estonia and highest commander of the Swedish Infantry  in the Baltic Dominions of Sweden. He defeated a German mercenary force near Tallinn in 1565.  He  was named to the position of High Councillor in 1566.  In 1565 he became governor of Reval and over Livonia. He lost command in 1567 after the failure of the Swedish siege of Narva in 1579  and was replaced by Pontus de la Gardie (c. 1520 – 1585).

King John III appointed him as Governor-General of Finland  and he served as such from 1572 until around 1580. This command included being commander-in-chief of all troops in Finland. He was one of leaders of attempted conquest of Northwestern Russia, in 1578-1580, but successes were only sporadic in midst of all sorts of failures.

In the 1580s, he was active in defence tasks: castellan of Käkisalmi fortress and governor of Eastern Finland. In the 1580s, he settled to Taipale Manor which he had built in Masku, and left Kankainen Manor to his eldest son, Field Marshal  Karl Henriksson Horn af Kanckas (1550–1601).

By 1584, his maternal half-brother Tyni Jaakonpoika Vundrank, lord of Salmenkylä (died before 1584) had died, apparently without any progeny, and his holdings in Vehkalahti (estates in Salmenkylä, Reitkalli, Hietakylä and Husu-Pyöli) passed to him. Later, in the early 17th century, a part of the Vehkalahti properties belonged to his grandson Klas Horn  and another part (Töytärinhovi of Vehkalahti) belonged to his other grandson, Admiral Henrik Fleming (1584–1650).

Personal life
In the mid-1540s (presumably around 1544), he married Elin Arvidsdotter  of the Teräskäsi-crested family (died 1577 at Kankainen Manor). She was a daughter of Arvid Eriksson (died 1529), lord of Sydänmaa Manor, justiciar of Karelia, castellan of Hämeenlinna and his wife Kirsti Nuutintytär of Laukko (fl. 1515; died 1551 at Grabbacka manor, Karis), and stepdaughter of Niiles Grabbe, castellan of Viipuri (died 1549 at Grabbacka manor, Karis).

From his marriage, he had at least ten children, including three sons Karl, Arvid and Yrjänä, and daughters Kirsti, Kaarina, Piriitta, Elina, Elisabeth and Anna. He and his wife  became the ancestors of  the noble Swedish family, Horn af Kanckas.  He  died on 21 June 1595 at the age of 83 at Kankainen Manor in Masku in southwestern Finland.

See also
Horn family

References

Other sources
 Blomstedt, Kaarlo (1921) Henrik Klaunpoika Horn – Ajankuvaus, I. Kustaa Vaasan ja Juhana herttuan palveluksessa. 1921. 544 pages.
 Elgenstierna, Gustaf:  ättartavlor ... introducerade adeln, vol III

Year of birth unknown
1595 deaths
16th-century Finnish nobility
16th-century Swedish nobility
People of the Livonian War
Swedish military officers
16th-century Swedish military personnel